The Bofrost Cup on Ice (the Fujifilm Trophy (1986–1987), the Nations Cup (1989–1997), the Sparkassen Cup on Ice (1998–2001)) was a senior international figure skating competition held in Germany from 1986 to 2004. The event adopted its final name in 2002.

Medals were awarded in the disciplines of men's singles, ladies' singles, pair skating, and ice dancing. It was part of the Grand Prix series from 1995, the series' inaugural year, until it was replaced by the Cup of China in 2003. After it lost its place in the Grand Prix series, the event was held twice more but in a modified format – instead of a short program, singles and pairs competed in a jumping and required elements contest, followed by the long program. Ice dancers performed their original and free dances.

Medalists

Men

Ladies

Pairs

Ice dancing

References

External links
 2003 Bofrost Cup background
 Comprehensive pairs result

 
ISU Grand Prix of Figure Skating
International figure skating competitions hosted by Germany
Recurring sporting events established in 1986
Recurring events disestablished in 2004